In power engineering, Kron reduction is a method used to reduce or eliminate the desired node without need of repeating the steps like in Gaussian elimination. 

It is named after American electrical engineer Gabriel Kron.

See also
 Schur complement
 Fuse Boards
 Power-flow study

References

Power engineering
Electric power